Orange Council may be:

Australia
New South Wales
Orange City Council

United States
California
North Orange Council
Northern Orange County Council
Orange County Council
Orange Empire Area Council

Massachusetts
Orange Council (Massachusetts)

New Jersey
East Orange Council
Orange Council (New Jersey)
Orange Mountain Council
Oranges & Maplewood Area Council
South Orange Council
West Orange Council

New York
Fort Orange Council
Fort Orange-Uncle Sam Council
Orange County Council (New York)
Orange-Sullivan Council

Texas
Orange County Council (Texas)